The Second Chen–Chiang summit was part of a series of the Chen-Chiang summit of cross-strait meetings.  It was the first major meeting between the Association for Relations Across the Taiwan Straits (ARATS) and Straits Exchange Foundation (SEF) leaders in Taiwan.  The meeting lasted from November 3 to 7, 2008 in Taipei, Taiwan.

Background
In the past, planes had to fly into Hong Kong airspace while traveling between the two sides. At the time, the meeting was one of the highest-level exchanges between officials from mainland China and Taiwan since 1949, when the Kuomintang, the party led by Chiang Kai-shek, lost the Chinese civil war to the Communists and retreated to Taiwan.

Pre-meeting
Earlier, on October 21, 2008, another Chinese envoy, Zhang Mingqing (張銘清), was pushed to the ground by Taiwan Independence activists in a scuffle in Tainan while visiting Taiwan. As a result, Taiwan police decided to mobilize a total of 7,000 officers for Chen's protection. The 1025 demonstration also occurred on October 25.

The night before the first day meeting, Chen Yun-lin was trapped by protesters at the Grand Formosa Regent Taipei hotel, while attending a banquet. Hundreds of protesters surrounded the hotel, chanting, throwing eggs and burning Chinese flags, according to news agencies. The riot police clashed with the protesters, and dozens of people were injured.

Meeting
On November 3 Chen paid a visit to the wife of Koo Chen-fu, a former SEF chairman who died in 2005.

The official talk between leaders of the SEF and ARATS was held in the morning of November 4. Both sides held press conferences. On November 4, 2008, mainland China's Chen Yun-lin met with his Taiwanese counterpart, Chiang Pin-kung, head of Taiwan's Straits Exchange Foundation (SEF). Together, they signed the 2008 Taiwan-China Cross Straits Economic Pact providing for direct passenger flights across the 100-mile-wide Taiwan Strait that separates Taiwan from mainland China.

In a conference at the Taipei Guest House, Ma reiterated his three-point China policy of “no independence,” “no unification” and “no war” across the strait. Ma said Chen signed four agreements with Chiang Pin-kung, chairman of the Straits Exchange Foundation (SEF), on shortened air routes, direct maritime shipping, better mail service and food safety.

In the morning, Chen met Legislative Speaker Wang Jin-pyng, attended the opening of two cross-straits seminars and lunched with People First Party chairman James Soong. During the afternoon, he toured the Hsinchu Science Park. Chen Yun-lin's final public engagement was a dinner with Kuomintang chairman Wu Poh-hsiung at Taipei's Grand Formosa Regent Hotel. The venue became a magnet for hundreds of protesters. Ma pointed out, “the Republic of China is an independent, sovereign state which has existed for 97 years. That is the fact nobody can change!"

President Ma Ying-jeou met with Chen Yun-lin at the Taipei Guest House at 11:00 am on November 6, 2008. The meeting between Ma and Chen lasted only five minutes. The two officials exchanged gifts. Chen presented Ma with a painting of a horse (Ma's surname means horse), and Ma gave Chen a piece of fine porcelain.

Chen offered Nyssaceae seedlings, a rare plant that only grows in mainland China, to Ma, along with two pandas. In return Ma offered an indigenous goat naemorhedus swinhoei and a spotted deer as gifts.

Chen addressed Ma as You, and avoided addressing Ma as president. Doing so would have implied that the mainland recognizes the legitimacy of the Republic of China. The question of how Chen would address Ma was much discussed by political analysts on both sides.

On November 7, 2008, Chen and Chiang Pin-kung participated in a farewell ceremony at the Grand Hotel in Taipei.

Aftermath

DPP
Democratic Progressive Party chairwoman Tsai Ing-wen (蔡英文) criticized the government for taking Taiwan back to martial law for the sake of one Chinese visitor.

Kuomintang
President Ma Ying-jeou blamed unruly protesters on poor organization on the part of the opposition Democratic Progressive Party and its chairwoman, Tsai Ing-wen. Ma also accused DPP Secretary-General Wang Tuo of reneging on his promise of peaceful demonstrations. Ma described Tsai's managing of protests as a "road [Tsai] knows little about and a thing she is not good at doing" which yielded "unexpected consequences." All told, the police department reported 149 of its officers injured during the protests.

Students
About 400 students, led by assistant professor of sociology at National Taiwan University Lee Ming-tsung (李明璁), started the sit-in in front of the Executive Yuan on November 6 at noon after violent oppression of previous protest by policemen. The students call themselves Wild Strawberry student movement and believe that police, while protecting the safety of Chen and his delegation, acted improperly and that freedom of speech had been suppressed. The sit-ins now lasting for over a month have three demands
 An open apology from President Ma Ying-jeou and Premier Liu Chao-shiuan to all citizens
 The resignation of National Police Agency Director-General Wang Cho-chiun (王卓鈞) and National Security Bureau Director Tsai Chaoming (蔡朝明)
 The swift amendment of the Parade and Assembly Law (集會遊行法).

Self-immolation
An 80-year-old man, a former KMT member named Liu Bai-yan (劉柏煙), sets himself on fire at Taipei Liberty Square. He suffered from 80% body burns. His suicide note referred to Chen as follows: "When Chen Yun-lin met with the President [Ma Ying-jeou], he pointed his finger at the President, saying "you, you, you". I think, the President looked quite content, smiling a little. Is the President's name "you, you, you"? As a member of Kuomintang, I am embarrassed by this display. If the mainland sends over someone higher, shouldn't the President kneel?" Liu died on December 14, 2008.

See also
 Chen-Chiang summit

References

Internet video
Documentary on the visit of communist official Chen Yun-lin when Taiwan police pulled down Blue Sky White Sun Flag
破黑箱．顧飯碗 綠號召十萬人上街 15 December 2009 民視新聞
民進黨邀台聯1220遊行 估逾10萬人

External links
Free searchable biography of Chen Yun-lin at China Vitae
Taiwan President Ma, China ARATS chair meeting not inappropriate: KMT Central News Agency 
Protesters say measures recall the martial law era
DPP-incited disturbance condemned in Taiwan (Xinhua) November 6, 2008
Mr. Chen did not address Mr. Ma as zongtong--president.
Taiwan DPP Chair leads the "anti-China" rally to besiege the city and Grand Hotel
Up to 30,000 in Taiwan anti-China rally ahead of talks AFP

Additional source
會胡志強　蘇嘉全建議陳雲林不要趴趴走 【12/19 19:35】 
高為邦：陳雲林是「迫害台商的首謀份子」
揭穿陳雲林視察災區等三個謬論 林保華
《林保華專論》我們向陳雲林抗議甚麼？
陳雲林：相信台方能保護代表團的安全和尊嚴
活捉陳雲林？ 民進黨：個人言論
「破黑箱、顧飯碗」大遊行　綠營發布「反共」動員令
陳雲林訪台 民進黨大遊行 星島日報報道
陳雲林今抵台 明簽署四協議 The Liberty Times
層層拒馬封街 民怨：回到戒嚴 The Liberty Times
馬對中軟趴趴 各行業皮皮剉 醫界擔憂 台灣人沒頭路 The Liberty Times
向中國怒吼 要陳雲林好看 The Liberty Times
陳雲林沒走機場大門 抗議撲空 聯合晚報
假飛彈、沖天炮 瞄準陳雲林 The Liberty Times
江陳會／陳雲林設宴回請　江丙坤脫口「馬總統」(2009/12/22 )

Cross-Strait interactions
2008 in Taiwan